Karl Ludwig Schulmeister (1770–1853) (also known as Carl Schulmeister or Charles Louis Schulmeister) was an Austrian double agent for France during the reign of Napoleon I.

Schulmeister was born in Baden and raised as a shepherd. His father was a Lutheran minister. Later in life he became a businessman and started a career as a smuggler at the "3, rue des Récollets" in Strasbourg, France,  and drifted into trading information as well as goods. He was a spy for the Austrian Empire and the Holy Alliance, but was recruited by General Savary to spy for France. His information led to the French capture of Louis-Antoine-Henri de Bourbon and also contributed to the victory at Austerlitz. Schulmeister also acted as a General in Napoleon's army, undertook espionage missions that took him into England and Ireland, and was appointed commissioner of police for Vienna during Napoleon's second occupation in 1809. At the peak of his career, he was director of the French Secret Service, but he ended life as a modest tobacconist in Strasbourg after the Hundred Days ended Napoleon's rule. Several books (in German and in French) have been written about him:
L. F. Dieffenbach, Carl Ludwig Schulmeister, der Hauptspion, (1897)
A. Elmer, Napoleon's Leibspion, (1931)
Gérald Arboit, Schulmeister, l'espion de Napoléon, Paris, Edilarge, 2011, 176 pages
Abel Douay, Gérard Hertault, Schulmeister. Dans les coulisses de la Grande Armée, Paris, Éditions de la Fondation Napoléon - Nouveau Monde Éditions, série Biographies, 2002, 350 p. 
Alexandre Elmer, L'Agent secret de Napoléon, Charles-Louis Schulmeister, Paris, Payot, 1932 [réédité en 2006 chez Lavozelle].
Paul Muller, L'espionnage militaire sous Napoléon Ier. Ch. Schulmeister, Paris, Berger-Levrault, 1896.

References

External links
 The world's greatest military spies and secret service agents By George Barton at Google Books
 The enemy within: a history of espionage By Terry Crowdy at Google Books

1770 births
1853 deaths
People from the Margraviate of Baden
Spies of the French Revolutionary and Napoleonic Wars
Austrian spies